Oak Hill is a city in Davidson County, Tennessee. The population was 4,529 at the 2010 census. The Tennessee Governor's Mansion is located in the city. Although the city is administered under the Metropolitan Government of Nashville and Davidson County, it retains its own municipal government.

History
During the 1790s, Judge John Overton established a horse-breeding farm at Oak Hill known as Travellers Rest.  After World War II Oak Hill, like other Nashville neighborhoods, saw an increase of new residents and homes being built. Oak Hill incorporated as a city in 1952, just before the governments of Davidson County and Nashville merged.

Geography

Demographics

As of the census of 2000, there were 4,493 people, 1,816 households, and 1,367 families residing in the city. The population density was 570.4 people per square mile (220.1/km2). There were 1,894 housing units at an average density of 240.5 per square mile (92.8/km2). The racial makeup of the city was 96.26% White, 0.98% African American, 0.11% Native American, 1.65% Asian, 0.02% Pacific Islander, 0.27% from other races, and 0.71% from two or more races. Hispanic or Latino of any race were 0.76% of the population.

There were 1,816 households, out of which 30.8% had children under the age of 18 living with them, 68.3% were married couples living together, 5.6% had a female householder with no husband present, and 24.7% were non-families. 20.6% of all households were made up of individuals, and 10.6% had someone living alone who was 65 years of age or older. The average household size was 2.47 and the average family size was 2.88.

In the city, the population was spread out, with 22.7% under the age of 18, 4.0% from 18 to 24, 23.2% from 25 to 44, 32.0% from 45 to 64, and 18.2% who were 65 years of age or older. The median age was 45 years. For every 100 females, there were 95.3 males. For every 100 females age 18 and over, there were 92.0 males.

The median income for a household in the city was $90,174, and the median income for a family was $104,952. Males had a median income of $70,963 versus $42,500 for females. The per capita income for the city was $58,932, the fourth highest in the state. None of the families and 1.2% of the population were living below the poverty line, including no under eighteens and 1.8% of those over 64.

Recreation
The majority of Radnor Lake State Park is located in Oak Hill.

Landmarks
The Tennessee Governor's Mansion is in Oak Hill.

Education
It is within Metro Nashville Public Schools.

There are two public schools and three private schools in the city limits. Public schools include Glendale Elementary School, and John Overton High School.

Private schools include Father Ryan High School of the Roman Catholic Diocese of Nashville, Franklin Road Academy, Oak Hill School, and Benton Hall Academy.

References

External links
 City of Oak Hill official website

Cities in Tennessee
Cities in Davidson County, Tennessee
Cities in Nashville metropolitan area